New Zealand competed at the 1984 Winter Olympics in Sarajevo, Yugoslavia.

Alpine skiing

Men

Women

See also
 New Zealand at the 1984 Winter Paralympics

References
Official Olympic Reports (PDF format)
 Olympic Winter Games 1984, full results by sports-reference.com

Nations at the 1984 Winter Olympics
1984
Winter Olympics